Chamani-ye Pain (also Romanized as Chamanī-ye Pā’īn, Chamanī Pa‘īn, and Chamānī-ye Pā’īn; also known as Chamān) is a village in Kuhsarat Rural District, in the Central District of Minudasht County, Golestan Province, Iran. At the 2006 census, its population was 132, in 36 families.

References 

Populated places in Minudasht County